Howe is a village and civil parish in South Norfolk, England. It is situated between Poringland, Brooke  and Shotesham.

Howe, from the Old Norse word haugr, is a Middle English topographic name for someone who lived by a small hill or a man-made mound or barrow. St Mary's church is one of 124 existing round-tower churches in Norfolk, showing many signs of construction in the Anglo-Saxon period, such as tall proportions, splayed porthole windows, and flint quoins. The ample-sized tower dates from the pre-Conquest period, being one of a series of Saxon round towers in Norfolk that demonstrate that the round tower design is at least 1000 years old. Several other features are of interest to the student of local church architecture. The church can be reached from Poringland, approx. 2 km away, along a lane through an open arable field, where another, later, round tower can be seen. There is a regular bus service from Norwich.

Notes

External links

St Mary's on the European Round Tower Churches Website

Villages in Norfolk
Civil parishes in Norfolk